Ray Iggleden (17 March 1925 – 17 December 2003) was an English footballer who played as an inside forward for Leicester City, Leeds United and Exeter City. He appeared over 100 times for Leeds and was their top scorer for one season. He was born in Hull.

References

External links
Biography of Ray Iggleden

1925 births
2003 deaths
English footballers
Association football forwards
Leeds United F.C. players
Leicester City F.C. players
Exeter City F.C. players